"Cry, Cry, Cry" is a single by American country music artist Connie Smith.  Released in September 1968, the song reached #20 on the Billboard Hot Country Singles chart. The single was later released on Smith's 1968 album entitled Connie in the Country. The song became Smith's first single to peak outside the top ten.

Chart performance

References

1968 singles
Connie Smith songs
Song recordings produced by Bob Ferguson (musician)
1968 songs